DeVault is a family name.  It may also refer to the following:

 People and places
 Devault, Pennsylvania
 The DeVault Memorial Stadium
 The DeVault-Massengill House in Tennessee